is a public prefectural university founded in 1992 in Eiheiji, Yoshida District, Fukui Prefecture, Japan. It has undergraduate faculties in economics, biotechnology, marine bioscience, and nursing and social welfare sciences. There are graduate programs in economics and business administration, bioscience and biotechnology, and nursing and social welfare science.

References

External links
Official website 
Official website 

Educational institutions established in 1992
Universities and colleges in Fukui Prefecture
Public universities in Japan
American football in Japan
Eiheiji, Fukui
1992 establishments in Japan